Sam Maxwell may refer to:

 Sam Maxwell (boxer) (born 1988), English professional boxer
 Sam Maxwell (weightlifter) (born 1964), American former weightlifter